Justin Yeo is an Australian former professional rugby league footballer who played for North Sydney and Balmain in the National Rugby League competition.

Yea is noted for his support of local community events including the Gulgong 7s.

Background
Yeo was born in Dubbo, New South Wales, Australia. His son, Isaah Yeo, plays for the Penrith Panthers.

Playing career
Yeo made his first grade debut for North Sydney in Round 12 in 1998 against Cronulla at Shark Park. In 1999, he joined Balmain and made his debut for the club in the Round 1 game which, coincidentally, was also against Cronulla. Balmain lost the match 44–0.

Yeo left Balmain when it merged with Western Suburbs and returned to captain coach Dubbo CYMS in Group 11 of the New South Wales Country Rugby League.

References

1976 births
Living people
Australian rugby league players
Balmain Tigers players
North Sydney Bears players
Rugby league players from Dubbo